Kim Ju-ae (born ) is the daughter of North Korean supreme leader Kim Jong-un and his wife Ri Sol-ju.

Biography 
Kim Ju-ae is generally believed to have been born in 2012–2013. Ri Sol-ju had been absent from North Korean media during 2012, which has been later attributed to her pregnancy. Her name became known outside North Korea when Dennis Rodman, who has a close personal relationship with Kim Jong-un, identified her in an account of a visit he made to the country the previous year. Rodman described "[holding] their baby Ju-ae" and complimented Kim as a "good dad". Kim Ju-ae is believed to have an older brother born in 2010 and a younger sibling of unknown sex born in 2017.

Kim Ju-ae appeared in public for the first time at a missile launch in November 2022. She had made five public appearances by early February 2023. State media initially called her Kim Jong-un's "beloved" daughter but soon began using the adjective "respected", which is reserved only for the most honoured members of North Korean society, such as Kim Ju-ae's parents. Some analysts believe that her new public profile is an attempt to present the Kim family in the fashion of a traditional monarchy or a response to rivalries within the North Korean government. It has also led to speculation that she has been chosen as her father's successor, which could make her the first woman to serve as Supreme Leader. To commemorate the 18 November missile launch, the state-run Korea Stamp Corporation unveiled new postage stamps featuring Kim Ju-ae on 15 February 2023. On 18 February, she was seen with her father participating at a festivity marking the birth anniversary of Kim Jong-il, or the Day of the Shining Star.

Family tree

See also 
 Heir apparent

References 

Date of birth missing (living people)
Place of birth missing (living people)
Living people
Daughters of national leaders
Kim dynasty (North Korea)